In mathematics, the main conjecture of Iwasawa theory is a deep relationship between p-adic L-functions and ideal class groups of cyclotomic fields, proved by Kenkichi Iwasawa for primes satisfying the Kummer–Vandiver conjecture and proved for all primes by
. The Herbrand–Ribet theorem and the Gras conjecture are both easy consequences of the main conjecture.
There are several generalizations of the main conjecture, to totally real fields, CM fields, elliptic curves, and so on.

Motivation
 was partly motivated by an analogy with Weil's description of the zeta function of an algebraic curve over a finite field in terms of eigenvalues of the Frobenius endomorphism on its Jacobian variety. In this analogy,
 The action of the Frobenius corresponds to the action of the group Γ.
 The Jacobian of a curve corresponds to a module X over Γ defined in terms of ideal class groups.
 The zeta function of a curve over a finite field corresponds to a p-adic L-function.
 Weil's theorem relating the eigenvalues of Frobenius to the zeros of the zeta function of the curve corresponds to Iwasawa's main conjecture relating the action of the Iwasawa algebra on X to zeros of the p-adic zeta function.

History
The main conjecture of Iwasawa theory was formulated as an assertion that two methods of defining p-adic L-functions (by module theory, by interpolation) should coincide, as far as that was well-defined. These proofs were modeled upon Ken Ribet's proof of the converse to Herbrand's theorem (the Herbrand–Ribet theorem).

In 2014, Christopher Skinner and Eric Urban proved several cases of the main conjectures for a large class of modular forms. As a consequence, for a modular elliptic curve over the rational numbers, they prove that the vanishing of the Hasse–Weil L-function L(E, s) of E at s = 1 implies that the p-adic Selmer group of E is infinite. Combined with theorems of Gross-Zagier and Kolyvagin, this gave a conditional proof (on the Tate–Shafarevich conjecture) of the conjecture that E has infinitely many rational points if and only if L(E, 1) =  0, a (weak) form of the Birch–Swinnerton-Dyer conjecture. These results were used by Manjul Bhargava, Skinner, and Wei Zhang to prove that a positive proportion of elliptic curves satisfy the Birch–Swinnerton-Dyer conjecture.

Statement
 p is a prime number.
 Fn is the field Q(ζ) where ζ is a root of unity of order pn+1.
 Γ is the largest subgroup of the absolute Galois group of F∞ isomorphic to the p-adic integers.
 γ is a topological generator of Γ
 Ln is the p-Hilbert class field of Fn.
 Hn is the Galois group Gal(Ln/Fn), isomorphic to the subgroup of elements of the ideal class group of Fn whose order is a power of p.
 H∞ is the inverse limit of the Galois groups Hn.
 V is the vector space H∞⊗ZpQp.
 ω is the Teichmüller character.
 Vi is the ωi eigenspace of V.
 hp(ωi,T) is the characteristic polynomial of γ acting on the vector space Vi
 Lp is the p-adic L function with Lp(ωi,1–k) = –Bk(ωi–k)/k, where B is a generalized Bernoulli number.
 u is the unique p-adic number satisfying γ(ζ) = ζu for all p-power roots of unity ζ
 Gp is the power series with Gp(ωi,us–1) = Lp(ωi,s)

The main conjecture of Iwasawa theory proved by Mazur and Wiles states that if i is an odd integer not congruent to 1 mod p–1 then the ideals of Zp – T –  generated by hp(ωi,T) and Gp(ω1–i,T) are equal.

Notes

Sources

Conjectures
Cyclotomic fields
Theorems in algebraic number theory